Dance of the Phoenix is a Chinese television series starring Yang Chaoyue and Xu Kaicheng.

Synopsis
Medicine student Meng Yuan finds herself transported into the body of a woman named Feng Wu – who lives in a fantasy land where magic and martial arts rule the world.
Feng Wu, a former genius girl is discarded after falling victim to a plot against her. She is engaged to a prince named Jun Lin Yuan. The forces of evil are strong in this strange land, however. And Meng Yuan soon discovers that if she is to make her life as Feng Wu a success, she will have to learn how to defend herself against danger and make powerful friends. 
Could she learn to love her new life – and her new husband, too?

Cast 
Main

Supporting

OST

References 

Chinese fantasy television series
2020 Chinese television series debuts
2020 web series debuts
Chinese web series
Tencent original programming
Television series by Tencent Penguin Pictures